Augstkalne Parish is an administrative unit of Dobele Municipality in the Semigallia region of Latvia. At the beginning of 2014, the population of the parish was 1067. The administrative center is Augstkalne village.

Towns, villages and settlements of Augstkalne parish 
 Augstkalne
 Dzeguzēni
 Klinti

Notable residents 
 Georg Mancelius (1593-1654), German Baltic Lutheran theologian and linguist, rector of the University of Tartu, author of the first Latvian dictionary (1638).
 Christoph Friedrich Neander (de) (1723-1802), German Baltic Lutheran pastor, Enlightenment movement worker, author of Kurzeme songbook (1766).

See also 
 Mežmuiža Manor

References

External links 
 

Parishes of Latvia
Dobele Municipality
Semigallia